Abad Santos Avenue is a major north–south arterial road located in the district of Tondo in northern Manila, Philippines. It is a divided roadway with four lanes in each direction running through the eastern edge of Tondo from the intersection with Rizal Avenue near the Manila Chinese Cemetery at its north end to Recto Avenue near the Tutuban railway station at the district boundary of Tondo and Binondo at the south.

History
Abad Santos Avenue was originally built in the early 19th century under Spanish rule as a narrow residential street in the pueblo of Tondo called Calle Manuguit. The street was believed to have been named after a pre-Hispanic ruling clan of Tondo whose members included Don Agustin Manuguit, a local minister who participated in the Revolt of the Lakans. It was extended south to Barrio Palomar to link with Calle Palomar from just south of Calle Mayhaligue to its terminus at Calle Azcarraga (now Recto Avenue). In 1955, through Republic Act 1256, Manuguit Street was renamed in honor of José Abad Santos, Chief Justice of the Supreme Court of the Philippines, who was executed by the Japanese invading forces during World War II.

Route
Abad Santos Avenue begins at a split from Rizal Avenue just south of Hermosa Street near the San Jose Manggagawa de Manuguit Church and the Manila Chinese Cemetery at Tondo's border with Santa Cruz district. It runs south across the mostly residential area of Manuguit crossing Solis Street and the Philippine National Railways line at Antipolo Street. The avenue then enters the Tayuman area and intersects with Yuseco Street (formerly Calle Tayabas), Tayuman Street (Calle Morga), and Quiricada Street. South of Bambang Street (Calle Trozo), Abad Santos traverses the Tutuban area that is home to Seng Guan Temple, Chiang Kai Shek College, the Philippine Cultural College, as well as General Hizon Elementary School and Gregorio del Pilar Elementary School. The road ends at the junction with Recto Avenue (Calle Azcarraga) close to the Divisoria shopping district.

Abad Santos Avenue has a short extension into Binondo and Plaza San Lorenzo Ruíz south of Recto Avenue as Reina Regente Street. It is served by the Abad Santos station at Rizal Avenue.

Intersections

Photos

References

Streets in Manila
Tondo, Manila